The Edge of the Law is a 1917 American silent crime drama film directed by Louis Chaudet and starring Ruth Stonehouse, Lloyd Whitlock and Lydia Yeamans Titus.

Cast
 Ruth Stonehouse as Nancy Glenn
 Lloyd Whitlock as Ralph Harding
 Lydia Yeamans Titus as Mrs. Harding
 Harry Dunkinson as Spike 
 M.W. Testa as Pop Hogland
 Jack Dill as Pliny Drew 
 Betty Schade as Stella Farnsworth

References

Bibliography
 Robert B. Connelly. The Silents: Silent Feature Films, 1910-36, Volume 40, Issue 2. December Press, 1998.

External links
 

1917 films
1917 drama films
1910s English-language films
American silent feature films
American black-and-white films
Universal Pictures films
Films directed by Louis Chaudet
1910s American films
Silent American drama films